Festspiele Balver Höhle is an arts festival, featuring musical and theatrical performances, in Balve, Germany. The festival is centered on the cave of Balve (Balver Höhle in German). The association was founded in 1985 in Volkringhausen and based on an idea by Franz Hoffmeister and Theodor Pröpper.

Activities
A valuable part of Festspiele Balver höhle is the festival.

Balver Märchenwochen
The most successful adaption was Pippi in Taka-Tuka-Land in the year 2001. In 2009 they did a piece called "Der kleine Muck".

Justus Frantz
The German musical director and pianist Justus Frantz was invited by the Festspiele Balver Höhle from 1995 to 2007 each year. In the early years it was a cooperation with the Kreishandwerkerschaft Märkischer Kreis.

He conducted a soulful version of Tchaikovsky's 5th symphony with the Philharmonie der Nationen.

Festivals

Balver Märchenwochen (1991–2008)
Directors: Gabriele Krieger, Josef Bertsch
Irish Folk & Celtic Music (2002–2008)
Directors: Sean Reeves, Stephan Haarmann
Internationales Jazz- und Bluesfestival (1970–2005)
Directors: Frank Milewski, Bernd Bobbenkamp (2005)

Single music acts
Rustavi ensemble (1988)
Carmina Burana (1994)
Klangräume (1996)
Idea and production by Joachim-Ernst Berendt.
Earth Spirit (1997)
Director: Christian Bollmann. With Oberton-Chor Düsseldorf.
Tu es Petrus (1997)
Played by Märkisches Jugendsinfonieorchester and sung by Oratorienchor Letmathe.
Om mani padme hum (2001)
Director: Christian Bollmann. With David Ianni.
Aida (2004)
Director: ?. Production: Loreley Klassik
Philharmonic Orchestra Hagen (2002)
Director: Antony Hermus
Scala & Kolacny Brothers (2005)

Single theatre acts
Katharina von Georgien (1985–1986)
Director: Hermann Wedekind. With Werner Traud (Shah Abbas).
The Crucible (1987)
Director: Werner Traud. Performed by VHS-Theatergruppe Iserlohn.
Peer Gynt (1990)
Director: Hermann Wedekind. Performed by Theaterwerkstatt Melchiorsgrund and a georgian orchestra.
The Caucasian Chalk Circle (1993)
Director: Hermann Wedekind. Performed by Theaterwerkstatt Melchiorsgrund and georgian singers.
Das große Welttheater (1995)
Director: Hermann Wedekind. Georgian children ensemble.
Iphigenie auf Tauris (1996)
Director: Alfred Gärtner. With Werner Traud (Thoas) and Angela Amecke-Mönnighof (Iphigenie). Additional actor: Sascha Rotermund
Jedermann (2005)
Director: Werner TraudSpecial features: Frank Butterweck sings the invitation, composed by Linke/Traud.

Rehearsals
Krippenspiel (started 1998, initiated by children's ensemble)
Christian Bollmann (until 1999)
Jazzfestival (until 2005)

Patronage
Johannes Rau († 2006), patron 1985 – 1998
Wolfram Kuschke, patron 1999 – 2008

Board

Chairmen
In December 2007 Winfried Hagen resigned as chairman together with his wife Gabriele Hagen, his daughter Stephanie Hagen and the arts director Werner Traud.

History
Agatha Allhoff-Cramer (†), chairman 1985 – 1995
Werner Traud, chairman 1996 – 2003
Winfried Hagen, chairman 2004 – 2007

Directors
The director organizes the cultural events at Festspiele Balver Höhle. The board appoints the artistic director.

Artistic directors
Hermann Wedekind († 1998), artistic director 1985 – 1996
Alfred Gärtner, artistic director 1997 – 2000
Jochen Zoerner-Erb, artistic director 2001 – 2003
Werner Traud, artistic director 2004 – 2007

Children's theatre director
The artistic director appoints the children's theatre director.
Werner Traud (1991 – 2000, 2004 – 2006)
Kai Wolters (2001–2003)
Matthias Hay (2007)
Gabriele Krieger (since 2008)

Dance director
The artistic director appoints the dance instructor especially for Balver Märchenwochen.
Monika Eickelmann (1991)
Sigrid Kanthack-Leser (1998) 
Claudia Waltermann (1998)
Anna Maczuga-Schwabe (until 2005)
Anke Lux (until 2007)
William Danne (2008)

Musical directors
The artistic director appoints the musical director especially for Balver Märchenwochen.
Alexander Schwarze (1998 – 1999, only Musical)
Walter Kiesbauer (until 2002)
Walter Czakiel (until 2003)
Philipp Schreiber (until 2007)
Ralf Linke in cooperation with Berthold Wagner (since 2004)

Discography

CDRobin Hood 1995Tu es Petrus 1997Aladdin und die Wunderlampe 1998Phantastische Reise zu Kapitän Nemo 1999Pippi in Taka-Tuka-Land 2001Peter Pan 2008

DVDDer Zauberer von OZ 2005Robin Hood 2006Peter Pan 20085th Irish Folk & Celtic Music 20066th Irish Folk & Celtic Music 2007

VideoKatharina von Georgien 1984Ronja Räubertocher 1993Robin Hood 1995Der Zauberer von OZ'' 2005

References

External links

 
Schützen Balve: DIRK BÜCHSENSCHÜTZ IST ROBIN HOOD – Proben für die Märchenwochen 2006 haben begonnen
Jazzfestival (Redirect)

Culture of North Rhine-Westphalia
Balve
Music festivals in Germany
Cultural organisations based in Germany
Westphalia culture
Theatre festivals in Germany